Bohumír Matal (13 February 1922 Brno – 7 July 1988 Prudká at Doubravník) was a Czech painter, one of the youngest members of Group 42. He was a significant celebrity in post-war painting in the 20th century in Brno.

Life 
Bohumír Matal studied 1937–1941 at School of Arts and Crafts in Brno (prof. E. Hrbek, František Václav Süsser). In 1941 he was arrested for antifascist activity and sent to the labor camp Lohbruck, Germany. He worked there in a chain factory.  Although he couldn't paint anymore, he wrote letters to his family which he supplemented with illustrations. During his stay in the labor camp he wrote more than 200 letters with black and white pencil illustrations.

In 1945 he returned from Germany in an ill health. After his recovery he started to paint again. After having an exhibition with the other young painters in Paris in 1946 he had his separate exhibition. His typical themes were human beings, city, civilization and industrialization - cement plants, paper mills etc. His first paintings contained themes as airships, ports and streets in the rain; gradually, his work was connected with the program of Group 42.

After political changes in 1948 Bohumír Matal locked himself away in his studio and continued in Group 42 style. He painted portraits and his famous paintings Cyclist 1952, 1954. In the first half of the 1950s the political situation changed and Bohumír Matal with Vladislav Vaculka and Vladimír Vašíček set up a Group Brno 57.

In the 1960s experiment and subtraction appeared in Matal's artwork. Except painting he was also engaged in scene design. After 1968 he left Brno and moved to Prudká at Doubravník, where he bought and renewed a mill as a studio. He died there after a long sickness 7 JULY.

References 

Czech painters
Czech male painters
Group 42